Duncan Francis Obee (July 9, 1918 - November 27, 1998) was an American professional football player who appeared in 3 games for the Detroit Lions in 1941.

References

1918 births
1998 deaths
Detroit Lions players